Rhabdochaeta pulchella is a species of tephritid or fruit flies in the genus Rhabdochaeta of the family Tephritidae.

Distribution
India, Sri Lanka, Thailand, Laos, Vietnam, Japan, Philippines, Malaysia, Indonesia, Papua New Guinea, Australia.

References

Tephritinae
Insects described in 1904
Taxa named by Johannes C. H. de Meijere
Diptera of Asia